This is a list of Italian football transfers featuring at least one Serie A or Serie B club which were completed in the winter of the 2016–17 season. The winter transfer window opened on 1 January 2017, although a few transfers took place prior to that date. The window will close at midnight on 31 January 2017. Players without a club can join one at any time, either during or in between transfer windows, as long as the team registers them.

Transfers
Legend
Those clubs in Italic indicate that the player already left the team on loan this season or new signing that immediately left the club.

Footnotes

References
general
 
 
specific

Winter transfers
2016–17
Italian